Escape at Dannemora is an American crime drama television limited series that premiered on Showtime on November 18, 2018. It is based on the 2015 Clinton Correctional Facility escape. The seven-episode series was created and written by Brett Johnson and Michael Tolkin and directed by Ben Stiller. It stars Benicio del Toro, Patricia Arquette, Paul Dano, Bonnie Hunt, Eric Lange, and David Morse.

Plot
The series is based on the true story of the 2015 Clinton Correctional Facility escape in upstate New York. The escape prompted a massive manhunt for the two convicted murderers, who were aided in their escape by a married female prison employee with whom they both became sexually entangled.

Cast

Main
 Benicio del Toro as Richard Matt,  a convicted murderer
 Patricia Arquette as Joyce "Tilly" Mitchell, a married prison worker who becomes romantically entangled with both Matt and Sweat and aids in their escape
 Paul Dano as David Sweat, a convicted murderer
 Bonnie Hunt as Catherine Leahy Scott, the New York State Inspector General heading up a formal investigation of the Matt–Sweat prison escape
 Eric Lange as Lyle Mitchell, Tilly's husband and maintenance worker at Clinton Correctional
 David Morse as Gene Palmer, the inmate escort guard at Clinton Correctional

Recurring
 Jeremy Bobb as Dennis Lambert, a corrections officer and friend of Lyle
 Michael Beasley as Murder, an inmate who’s given Sweat’s job as shop supervisor upon his firing.
 Joshua Rivera as Angel, a fellow inmate of Matt and Sweat's.
 Carolyn Mignini as Ilene Mulvaney, Tilly’s supervisor who frequently butts heads with her
 Gregory Dann as Albert Boyd, the fearsome and most loathed correctional officer at Clinton Correctional. Matt and Sweat made their escape on Boyd's shift.

Guest
 Michael Imperioli as Andrew Cuomo, Governor of New York
 Charlie Hofheimer as Kenny Barrile, Sr.
 Jim Parrack as Kevin Tarsia, a deputy sheriff

Production
Principal production commenced in Upstate New York from August 2017 to March 2018. For their roles, Patricia Arquette and Eric Lange each gained 40 pounds. Episode 6, the flashback episode, was filmed on 16 mm, unlike the rest of the series. Episode 6 was also the final episode filmed, so Arquette and Lange could lose the excess weight gained over the course of production. Director Ben Stiller decided to shut down production for a month and resume filming the episode once Arquette and Lange lost the weight. However, production was further delayed three weeks to accommodate the birth of Lange's son.

Episodes

Reception

Critical response
The series was met with acclaim upon its premiere. On the review aggregation website Rotten Tomatoes, the series holds an approval rating of 88% with an average rating of 7 out of 10, based on 60 reviews. The website's critical consensus reads, "Escape at Dannemoras slow pace demands patience, but those willing to wait will be rewarded with a chilling mystery that provides the perfect showcase for its talented cast — especially a nearly unrecognizable and unbearably moving performance from Patricia Arquette." Metacritic, which uses a weighted average, assigned the series a score of 78 out of 100 based on 27 critics, indicating "generally favorable reviews".

Response from Joyce Mitchell
In a December 2018 interview at the Bedford Hills Correctional Facility, Joyce Mitchell criticized some events portrayed in the miniseries. She claimed, "I never had sex with them", referring to Richard Matt and David Sweat. She also criticized director Ben Stiller, calling him "a liar just like the rest of the world. He doesn't care about the truth. All he cares about is making millions off me. He's an idiot."

Awards and nominations 

Notes

References

External links
 
 
 
 

2010s American drama television miniseries
2018 American television series debuts
2018 American television series endings
American biographical series
American prison television series
English-language television shows
Showtime (TV network) original programming
Television series by Red Hour Productions
Television series based on actual events
Television shows set in New York (state)
Television series set in 2015